Curtis P. Berlinguette is a professor of chemistry. and chemical and biological engineering at the University of British Columbia. He is also a CIFAR Program Co-Director, a principal investigator at the Stewart Blusson Quantum Matter Institute, and a Fellow of the Royal Society of Canada. His academic research group designs and builds electrochemical reactors for: 

 Reactive CO2 capture (featured in the Globe and Mail);
 Electro-catalytic hydrogenation; and 
 Low-temperature nuclear fusion (featured in Nature News, National Geographic, Financial Times, Interesting Engineering, T-Net). 

His research group also builds self-driving laboratories that combine flexible automation and artificial intelligence (featured in Science Magazine.)

Berlinguette is the CEO and Co-Founder of Miru Smart Technologies, a company that commercializes electrochromic windows.

Education and career

Berlinguette completed his BSc at the University of Alberta in 2000, and his PhD in inorganic chemistry at Texas A&M University in 2004 under the supervision of Professor Kim R. Dunbar. He then completed his postdoctoral studies at Harvard University under Professor Richard H. Holm. Berlinguette started his independent career in the Department of Chemistry and The Institute for Sustainable Energy, Environment & Economy at the University of Calgary in 2006 before moving his program to the University of British Columbia in 2013.

University spin-off companies 

Prof. Berlinguette co-founded Miru Smart Technologies, a venture-backed university spin-off commercializing electrochromic windows.

Awards, distinctions, fellowships, and memberships 

2021-Present | Fellow of the Royal Society Canada

2021-Present | Distinguished University Scholar, UBC

2020-2025 | CIFAR Co-Director (Bio-inspired Solar Energy)

2020 | CSC Award for Research Excellence in Materials Chemistry

2016 | RSC Alex Rutherford Medal for Chemistry

2016-2018 | NSERC E.W.R Steacie Memorial Fellowship

2016 | Strem Chemicals Award for Pure and Inorganic Chemistry

2014-2019 | Tier II Canada Research Chair in Solar Energy Conversion

2012 | Top 40 Under 40, Avenue Magazine (Calgary)

2011-2013 | Alfred P. Sloan Fellowship

References

External links 

 
 

Year of birth missing (living people)
Living people
Fellows of the Royal Society of Canada
University of Alberta alumni
Texas A&M University alumni
Harvard University alumni
Academic staff of the University of Calgary
Academic staff of the University of British Columbia
American chemical engineers